is a feminine Japanese given name.

Possible writings in Japanese
The name Mariko can be written using various kanji characters, each of which has a different meaning, such as the following:

 , "ball" + "child"
 , "truth" + "child"
 , "long distance" + "child"
 , "jasmine" + "child"
 , "hemp, village (country house)" + "child"

The name can also be written in hiragana or katakana:

  (hiragana)
  (katakana)

People
Notable people with the given name Mariko include:

 Mariko Daouda (born 1981), Ivorian football player
 Mariko Ebralidze, a Georgian jazz singer
 Mariko Gotō, a Japanese musician and actress
 , Japanese writer
 Mariko Iwadate, a Japanese manga artist
 Mariko Kaga, a Japanese actress
 Mariko Kawana, a Japanese AV idol and pink film actress
 Mariko Kōda, a Japanese voice actress and J-pop singer
 , Japanese writer
 , Japanese softball player
 Mariko Mori, a Japanese video and photographic artist
 Mariko Nanba,, a Japanese video game composer
 Mariko Nishiwaki, a Japanese volleyball player
 Mariko Ōhara, a Japanese science fiction writer
 Mariko Okada, a Japanese actress
 Mariko Okamoto, a Japanese volleyball player
 Mariko Peters, a Dutch politician
 Mariko Suzuki, a Japanese voice actress
 Mariko Shiga, a Japanese idol and voice actress
 Mariko Shimizu, a Japanese novelist
 Mariko Shinoda, a former member of the Japanese idol group AKB48
 , Japanese gymnast
 , Japanese model and actress
 , Japanese singer
 Mariko Takamura, a Japanese deaf artist, writer, and performer
 Mariko Yamada, an American Democratic assemblywoman
 Mariko Yamamoto, (born 1983), Japanese cricketer
 Mariko Yoshida, a Japanese professional wrestler
 Mariko Yoshida, a Japanese volleyball player
 , Japanese fencer
 Plum Mariko, a Japanese professional wrestler

Fictional characters
Notable fictional characters with the given name Mariko include:

 Mariko, a character in the newspaper and webcomic strip Piled Higher and Deeper
 Mariko Konjo, a character in the anime and manga series Ranma ½
 Mariko Kurama, a supporting character of the anime series Elfen Lied
 Mariko Shinobu, a character in the anime and manga series  Onii-sama e...
 Mariko Takeda, a fictional character from the comic book series W.I.T.C.H
 Mariko Tanaka, a character in the video game Wing Commander II: Vengeance of the Kilrathi
 Mariko Toda, a character in the novel Shōgun
 Mariko Uehara, a character from the television drama Nobuta wo Produce
 Mariko Uki, a character in the Japanese horror movie Ju-on: The Grudge
 Mariko Yashida, a character that appears in various comic books published by Marvel Comics

References
Dictionnaire des prénoms - Larousse - 2009

Japanese feminine given names